Mishaps Happening is an album by Quantic, released in 2004.

Track listing
Mishaps Happening – 7:32
Use What You Got (feat. Sonny Akpan) – 5:13
Sound of Everything (feat. Alice Russell) – 4:02
En Focus (feat. Trinidad) – 4:34
Trees and Seas – 4:53
Angels and Albatrosses – 5:13
Furthest Moment – 5:34
Don't Joke With a Hungry Man (feat. Spanky Wilson) – 5:18
Prelude to Happening – 6:25
When You're Through (feat. Spanky Wilson)– 4:38
Perception – 4:44
So Long (feat. Alice Russell) – 7:23

External links
 Official album page
 [ Mishaps Happening review] at Allmusic

2004 albums
Will Holland albums